Chong-Alay District (big Alay) is a district of Osh Region in far south-western Kyrgyzstan. The administrative seat lies at Daroot-Korgon. The Chong-Alay District include 3 rural communities: Chong-Alay, Kashka-Suu, and Jekendi.

History 
Eurasianet reported that on September 17, 2022, as part of the 2022 Kyrgyzstan-Tajikistan clashes, Chong-Alay District was the site of an exchange of mortar fire with Tajikistani troops.

Geography
Chong-Alay District occupies the western part of Alay Valley. The northern boundary of the district is located at Alay Mountains, and southern - at Trans-Alay Range. The valley is inclined from east to west, with the lowest point at 1560 meters above sea level.

Climate is sharply continental with cold winters. Annual precipitation is 500–650 mm. Average temperature in July is +19-22C, and December -10-15C.

The hydrology is dominated by the river Kyzyl-Suu (flowing towards the west) and its tributaries.

Demographics
According to the 2009 Census, the ethnic composition (de jure population) of the Chong-Alay District was 99.9% Kyrgyz and 0.1% other groups.

Populated places
In total Chong-Alay District comprised 22 settlements in 3 rural communities. Each rural community can consist of one or several villages. The rural communities and settlements in the Chong-Alay District are:

 Jekendi (seat: Karamyk; incl. Jekendi, Kara-Teyit, Shibee and Chuluk)
 Kashka-Suu (seat: Kashka-Suu; incl. Achyk-Suu, Kabyk, Kara-Kabak, Burgan-Suu, Jayylma and Kichi-Jayylma)
 Chong-Alay (seat: Daroot-Korgon; incl. Jar-Bashy, Jash-Tilek, Jaman-Jar, Kochkorchu, Kulchu, Kyzyl-Tuu, Sary-Bulak, Chak, Kyzyl-Eshme and Kara-Shybak)

References 

Districts of Osh Region